

Current Airlines
CalvinAir Helicopters
Caribbean Helicopters
Antigua Airways
LIAT

Defunct airlines

References

Airlines
Antigua and Barbuda
Aviation in Antigua and Barbuda
Airlines